Samundri Tehsil is an administrative subdivision of Faisalabad District in the Punjab province of Pakistan. Samundri is the city and headquarters of the tehsil. Samundri Tehsil farms are irrigated by Gugera Branch Canal and Burala Branch Canal.Ravi Muhall Ward No 5 is most famous area in Samundri

Chak No.203 GB Ferozpur is the biggest village of the tehsil by area and population.

All villages of the tehsil carry GB with their Chak numbers, and the name of village usually follows it (for example, Chak No 141 GB, Chak No 203 GB Ferozpur). The village numbers are designated by the water pump number the village is built upon. It has 14 villages that were made by the British government. Sugar cane is the major cash crop. wheat, cotton and vegetables are grown there. Samundri is one of the oldest tehsils of Pakistan.

Most families are Arain Gujjar and Jutt people.

History
The name Samundri comes from the presence of three Hindu temples. The name Seh-Mandri derives from the words seh (three) and mandr (temple). Thus, seh-mandri means a small city with three temples. The name later evolved into Samundri.

The city has many buildings constructed in the 1930s or before. Until 1904, during British rule, Samundri was headquarters of a tehsil in Jhang district . Samundri Tehsil was transferred to Lyallpur District when the latter was created.

The population in 1906 was 266,277, spread across 495 villages, including Samundri (population, 765), the headquarters. The land revenue and cesses in 1905-6 amounted to 600,000 to 700,000. The tehsil consists of a level plain, sloping gently towards the Ravi and the Deg on the south, and is now irrigated by the Chenab Canal, except for a few scattered plots in the Ravi lowlands which depend on wells. The soil is generally of fine quality. The boundaries of the tehsil were somewhat modified at the time of the formation of the New District.

By the 1900s, Western Punjab was predominantly Muslim, supporting the Muslim League and the Pakistan Movement. Migration between India and Pakistan was continuous before the Partition of India. After the Partition of India in August 1947, the Hindus and Sikhs migrated to India Amloh town of Punjab, while Muslims from India settled in Western Punjab and across Pakistan.

In 1947, when partition took place, many people from the village Nva Chakk 372 moved to Patiala District, Amloh, India (now Fatehgarh Sahib or Sirhind).

Demographics
The population is predominantly Punjabi Muslims speaking Punjabi and Urdu. The main clans in the Samundri Tehsil are Gujjars and Jutts, accounting to 80% of the total. [Rehmani=Kumhar], Arain, Rajput, Butts, Mugals, Ansaris, Shaikh and Quraishis are also present . The population is more than 99% Muslim with the remainder made up of Christians and Hindus.

Problems
The tehsil must cope with an extreme shortage of canal water. The shortage is a major reason for the poor economic conditions. Rainfall is rare or uneven. Lack of potable water causes poor health.

Facilities
Ten public and private hospitals are present, but child specialists and cardiologists are not available.

The area supports many colleges and schools.

Internet, mobile phone service and fixed-line phones are available in good quality.

One Academy Samundri is one leading institute providing international level science education in samundri, One Academy offer Science and English education from 9th to M.Sc.and O/A level also offer examination preparation classes like PPSC Lecturer and Assistant Professor, CSS, IELTS, MDCAT, SAT.

Transport 
Paved roads connect rural areas to the city and to Faisalabad, Gojra, Tandlianwala, Okara, and Rajana. Samundri Road and Jhang highways connect Faisalabad to Multan, Rahim Yar Khan, etc. 
Now Motorway from Lahore to karachi is launched three year ago, which is linked with this city(Samundri)
In the east many adults work in Persian Gulf states, while in the west many moved to Europe.

Notables
Mohammad Zakaullah, retired four-star rank admiral in the Pakistan Navy, was the 15th Chief of Naval Staff of the Pakistan Navy.
The Indian Kapoor family is of Punjabi Hindu origin is originally from Sammundari tehsil.
Prithviraj Kapoor was the first from the family to pursue a film career. He was born in 1906 in the town of Samundri in Punjab Province, British India. His grandfather, Keshavmal Kapoor, was a tehsildar in Samundri, Punjab, British India.

References

Tehsils of Punjab, Pakistan
Tehsil municipal administrations of Faisalabad